Všeruby is the name of several places in the Czech Republic:

Všeruby (Domažlice District), a market town in the Plzeň Region
Všeruby (Plzeň-North District), a town in the Plzeň Region